M. Dwayne Smith is an American criminologist and professor of criminology at the University of South Florida, where he is also the senior vice provost and Dean of the Office of Graduate Studies.

He is the founding editor of the peer-reviewed journal Homicide Studies, which he edited from 1996 to 2001. From 2000 to 2005, he was the chair of the University of South Florida's Department of Criminology. He is an expert on mass murderers and serial killers, and has also researched jury decisions in death penalty cases in North Carolina, as well as other criminological topics.

References

External links

Living people
University of Houston alumni
Duke University alumni
American criminologists
Academic journal editors
University of South Florida faculty
Year of birth missing (living people)